Tawfik Hamid (born 1961) is an author from Egypt. A self-described former member of the militant al-Gama'a al-Islamiyya, he says that he started to preach in mosques to promote his message and, as a result, became a target of Islamic militants, who threatened his life. Hamid then migrated to the United States where he has lectured at UCLA, Stanford University, University of Miami and Georgetown University against Islamic fundamentalism . He currently serves on the Advisory Council of The Intelligence Summit, an annual conference on security. Hamid has also appeared on television programs, including Fox's Glenn Beck Show, Fox News Channel, and the BBC's Religion and Ethics.

Hamid, also known as Tarek Abdelhamid, has a medical degree in internal medicine from the Cairo University, and a master's degree in literature from the University of Auckland.

Website and beliefs
Hamid owns and runs a website, IslamforPeace.org "to revive Islam, save it from anachronistic interpretations, and make it a true power to support the values of liberty and humanity." Hamid says he believes in developing respectful and positive relationships with other nations and religions. He says that he learned that position from the Qur'an.

Methodology
Hamid states on his site that his methodology is to incorporate three processes to get a holistic understanding of the Quran to teach others about it. These steps are:
 A probing analysis of the subtleties and complexities of the Arabic language to develop a more precise understanding of the Quran and the message it offers.
 Knowledge of the historical circumstances which occasioned the revelation of key Quranic verses.
 Interpreting Quranic suras (chapters) and verses holistically to better appreciate their overall significance and synergistic qualities, rather than individually, which leads only to literal interpretations that do not take into account other verses and even whole segments of the Quran.

Views on Islam
In a 2009 Wall Street Journal article, Hamid said that Islam should prove its peacefulness and called Islamic scholars and clerics "to produce a Shariah book that will be accepted in the Islamic world and that teaches that Jews are not pigs and monkeys, that declaring war to spread Islam is unacceptable, and that killing apostates is a crime."

He says that Muslim fundamentalists believe that Saudi Arabia's petroleum-based wealth is a divine gift and that Saudi influence is sanctioned by Allah. Thus, the Salafist extreme brand of Sunni Islam that spread from the Saudi Arabia to the rest of the Islamic world is regarded not merely as one interpretation of the religion but as the only genuine interpretation. The expansion of violent and regressive Islam, he continues, began in the late 1970s and can be traced precisely to the growing financial clout of Saudi Arabia.

In a 2006 radio show (the Orla Barry Show, part of Newstalk), he was quoted as saying: "There are different degrees of evil. Jemaah Islamiya represents the active evil or active terrorists let us call them who are ready to commit violent acts and all such atrocities. But the majority of Muslim are all passive terrorists. They believe in this evil. They support it either by money or emotionally they are not against it...The vast majority of Muslims were against any peaceful understanding. And they prefer this violent traditional teaching of Islam."

Views on Israel

Hamid said that most Muslims correlate the word Israel to the word Azrael that sounds like Israel but means "angel of death". This created a link in the minds of most Muslim children the need to hate the word Israel. In an article titled "Why I loved Israel based on the Qur'an", he writes that according to the Qur'an, God gave the Israelites the land of Israel as their promised land (Quran 17:104: And We said thereafter to the Children of Israel, "Dwell securely in the land of promise").

He explains the Quran went even further to consider the Promised Land as the permanent inheritance for the Israelites (26:59) "Thus it was, but we made the Children of Israel inheritors of such things (the Promised Land)"  He continued by saying, "No Muslim has the right to interfere with the gathering of the Jews in Israel, as this is the will of God himself" 

In 2007, Hamid served as a keynote speaker for The Intelligence Summit and now sits on their advisory board.

Bibliography 
Hamid is the author of "Inside Jihad." Originally self-published in 2007, the book was republished by Mountain Lake Press in 2015 in an updated and expanded edition, Inside Jihad: How Radical Islam Works, Why It Should Terrify Us, How to Defeat It. He has written opinion pieces for The Wall Street Journal, including Islam Needs To Prove It's A Religion Of Peace, How to End Islamophobia and The Trouble with Islam. Hamid participated in a symposium published by National Review Online, where he expressed his view on the Sudanese teddy bear blasphemy case. 

Hamid recounts his transformation into a jihadist in a piece published by the Hudson Institute, entitled The Development of a Jihadist's Mind.

Criticism 

Chris Bail, an Assistant Professor of Sociology at Duke University, has critiqued Hamid in his book, "Terrified: How Anti-Muslim Fringe Organizations Became Mainstream".

Articles
Why I love Israel (based on the Quran) by Dr. Tawfik Hamid
When I asked my Muslim friend, "Why do you hate the Jews?" by Dr. Tawfik Hamid
Is there a hope to reform Islam? by Dr. Tawfik Hamid

References

External links
 

Muslim reformers
Living people
Egyptian writers
Egyptian Zionists
Egyptian Quranist Muslims
Muslim supporters of Israel
1961 births